David Keenan (born April 1971) is a Scottish writer and author of four novels.

Career
He used to run the Glasgow record shop, distribution company and record label Volcanic Tongue.

Journalism
His work for The Wire (who he wrote for from 1996 to 2015) was highly influential, helping to focus the magazine more towards coverage of new experimental rock, noise, folk, industrial and psychedelic music. His most frequently cited article is a cover story that appeared in the August 2003 issue entitled "New Weird America", where Keenan coined the phrase "free folk", later bastardised to include "freak folk" and "wyrd folk" and used to describe everyone from Jack Rose and Charalambides through Devendra Banhart.

In an August 2009 piece for The Wire, Keenan coined "hypnagogic pop" to describe a group of musicians whose work resembled "pop music refracted through the memory of a memory". His article incited a slew of hate mail that derided hypnagogic pop as the "worst genre created by a journalist". Keenan became disenchanted with the movement once it homogenized with the mainstream.

A 2009 quote of Keenan cited by Karl Shaw, reproduced in his article in the Wall Street Journal (Review, 24–25 Sept 2011), on the Beatles: "The Beatles are the absolute curse of modern Indie music...my favorite Beatle is Yoko Ono; without Yoko's influence, I don't think there would be any Beatles music I could listen to."

Novels
His debut novel, This Is Memorial Device (Faber, 2017), won the Collyer Bristow Award for Debut Fiction and was shortlisted for the 2017 Gordon Burn Prize. His second novel, For the Good Times (Faber, 2019), won the 2019 Gordon Burn Prize. Edna O'Brien described reading his third novel, Xstabeth (White Rabbit, 2020), as 'feel[ing] like being cut open to the accompanying sound of ecstatic music’. His fourth novel, Monument Maker, was published by White Rabbit in 2021.

He is also the author of England's Hidden Reverse, a biography of Coil, Current 93 and Nurse with Wound.

References

External links
Interview in Stylus magazine

Living people
Melody Maker writers
The Wire (magazine) writers
Scottish rock musicians
Scottish experimental musicians
Scottish journalists
1971 births
21st-century Scottish novelists
21st-century Scottish writers